Nur Ahmed Nur (نور احمد نور), an Afghan communist, belonging to the Parcham faction. Nur was one of four candidates of the People's Democratic Party of Afghanistan who were elected to the Afghan parliament in 1965. After the overthrow of the Daoud government in April 1978, Nur became Minister for Internal Affairs. In July the same year, Nur was removed from his office and sent to Washington as the new Afghan ambassador to the United States.

Nur was a politburo member of the PDPA and the Secretary of the Central Committee of the party.

References 

Communist government ministers of Afghanistan
Ambassadors of Afghanistan to the United States
Living people
1937 births